Baqerabad (also Romanized as Bāqerābād) is a village in Kah Rural District, Central District, Davarzan County, Razavi Khorasan Province, Iran. At the 2006 census, its population was 311, in 76 families.

See also 

 List of cities, towns and villages in Razavi Khorasan Province

References 

Populated places in Davarzan County